The Canada U-23 men's national soccer team (also known as Canada Olympic soccer team) represents Canada in international soccer at this age level. They are overseen by the Canadian Soccer Association, the governing body for soccer in Canada.

Unlike UEFA member associations that use U-21 regional competitions as Olympic qualifying, as a member of CONCACAF, Canada's U-23 team competes in regional qualifying in the same year as the Summer Olympics, and its call-ups are traditionally only limited to players under 23 years of age.

History

2008 qualifying
Known for his vocal antics on the touchline, Nick Dasovic led Canada through Olympic qualifying in 2008, drawing Mexico 1–1 and helping to eliminate the heavily favoured Mexican side in the process. After a highly promising 5–0 win over Guatemala on a night when Mexico had to better that result against Haiti but could only win 5–1, Canada fell to the United States 3–0 in the semifinal, losing out on a spot in Beijing at the Olympics that summer. Canada recovered to defeat Guatemala in the third-place playoff, a rematch of their first-round game, winning on penalties (5–3) after a scoreless draw through 120 minutes.

2012 qualifying
Tony Fonseca led Canada to an opening game 0–0 draw against El Salvador. Following this, Canada stunned the United States 2–0, contributing to their surprising early elimination on home soil. Canada disappointed in their final group stage game with a 1–1 tie versus Cuba, setting up a more difficult semi-final for them against Mexico, which they would lose 3–1.

2016 qualifying
It was announced in August 2015 that Canada head coach Benito Floro would be in charge of the Olympic team. The final squad for qualification was announced on September 18, 2015.

Results & fixtures

2021

Players

Current squad
The following 20 players were named to the squad for the 2020 CONCACAF Men's Olympic Qualifying Championship. Caps and goals as of March 28, 2021, after the game against Mexico.

Recent call-ups

The following players have been called up within the last 12 months and are still eligible at U23 level.

Competitive record

Summer Olympics

Pan American Games

Honours
 CONCACAF Olympic Qualifying Tournament
 Runners-up: 1996

See also

 Canada men's national soccer team
 Canada men's national under-20 soccer team
 Canada men's national under-17 soccer team
 Canada men's national futsal team
 Soccer in Canada

References

under-23
North American national under-23 association football teams